Hypsoblennius robustus is a species of combtooth blenny found in the south-eastern Pacific Ocean, from the Gulf of Guayaquil in southern Ecuador and Peru.  This species grows to a length of  SL.

References

robustus
Fish described in 1960